Grounding - Die letzten Tage der Swissair (en:Grounding - The last days of Swissair) is a film about the collapse in 2001 of Swissair, Switzerland's national airline, by Michael Steiner and Tobias Fueter, presented in January 2006. Producers: Peter-Christian Fueter & Pascal Najadi.

References

External links
 

2006 films
Films based on actual events
Swiss drama films
Aviation films
Swiss German-language films